Exposition Park is a  in the south region of Los Angeles, California, in the Exposition Park neighborhood. Established in 1872 as an agricultural fairground, the park includes the Los Angeles Memorial Coliseum, Banc of California Stadium, the California Science Center, the Natural History Museum of Los Angeles County, and the California African American Museum. The Lucas Museum of Narrative Art is under construction. Bounded by Exposition Boulevard to the north, South Figueroa Street to the east, Martin Luther King Jr. Boulevard to the south and Vermont Avenue  to the west, it is directly south of the main campus of the University of Southern California.

The park is a public open space, managed by the Sixth District Agricultural Association.

Features

Exposition Park houses the following:
LA84 Foundation/John C. Argue Swim Stadium 
 BMO Stadium
 Home of Los Angeles FC 
 Lucas Museum of Narrative Art (under construction)
 Los Angeles Memorial Coliseum
 Home of USC Trojans football
 Natural History Museum of Los Angeles County 
 California Science Center
 IMAX Theatre at California Science Center
 Space Shuttle Endeavour
 Exposition Park Rose Garden
 California African American Museum
 Concrete hand and footprints signed by Ed Begley Jr. of St. Elsewhere and other actors from medical TV shows such as Ben Casey
 EXPO Center (includes the LA84 Foundation/John C. Argue Swim Stadium) and the Soboroff Sports Field (soccer).  Originally managed in 2006 by Bentley Management Group, the Soboroff Sports Field was demolished in 2018 to allow construction of the Lucas Museum of Narrative Art.
 Science Center School and Amgen Center for Science Learning (formerly California National Guard Armory)

The cultural facilities mentioned above are operated by both the state and Los Angeles County.

Former venues
 Los Angeles Memorial Sports Arena

History
The  site served as an agricultural fairground from 1872 to 1910 (hence its original name, "Agricultural Park"). In 1880, John Edward, Ozro W. Childs, and former California Governor John G. Downey persuaded the State of California to purchase  in Los Angeles to foster agriculture in the Southland. Farmers sold their harvest and arces on the grounds, while horses, dogs, and even camels competed on a racetrack where a rose garden now sits and blooms. In 1909, a group of civic-minded individuals led by former Pasadena Mayor Horace Dobbins set about reforming the park, removing the racetrack and other activities and replacing them with gardens and museums.

At the 2028 Summer Olympics, the Coliseum will host Athletics as well as the main closing ceremony. The Banc of California Stadium will be one of the soccer venues.

Public transportation
Along the northern edge of the park, the Metro E Line light rail line serves the park with its Expo Park/USC Station. On the northeast, (Flower Street and 37th Street), the Metro J Line bus rapid transit serves Exposition Park & USC at its 37th Street/USC Station on the Harbor Transitway. The J Line station is located on the freeway median level of the 1-110 freeway.

Department of Public Safety

The Exposition Park Department of Public Safety provides law enforcement and security services to the Park. DPS officers are California peace officers sworn under section 830.7 of the California Penal Code and have peace officer powers of arrest while on duty. Since 2014, the DPS has been managed under contract by the California Highway Patrol, who provide management, leadership, training, and policy development for the DPS. The Chief of the Department is CHP Captain Mariano Santiago.

See also

 California State and Consumer Services Agency
 List of parks in Los Angeles

References

External links

Official website — Exposition Park.
 University Park Family — an online newspaper and social network focused on the neighborhoods around USC and Exposition Park, and the surrounding areas.
 Leimert Park Beat — a collaborative online community focused nearby Leimert Park: "The Soul of Los Angeles and the African American cultural center of the city".

 
Parks in Los Angeles
Exposition Park (Los Angeles neighborhood)
Landmarks in Los Angeles
Tourist attractions in Los Angeles
Museums in Los Angeles
Neighborhoods in Los Angeles
Olympic Parks
California Natural Resources Agency
South Los Angeles
Venues of the 1932 Summer Olympics
Venues of the 1984 Summer Olympics
Venues of the 2028 Summer Olympics